Anthony Barker MA (d. 1551) was a Canon of Windsor from 1541 - 1551.

Career
He was educated at Corpus Christi College, Oxford and graduated MA in 1523.

He was appointed:
Rector of Wroughton, Wiltshire 1530
Vicar of West Ham, Essex 1538
Vicar of Binford, Oxford 1542
Vicar of Burfield, Berkshire 1547
Prebendary of Winchester
Prebendary of Lincoln 1540

He was appointed to the twelfth stall in St George's Chapel, Windsor Castle in 1541, and held the stall until 1551.

Notes 

1551 deaths
Canons of Windsor
Alumni of Corpus Christi College, Oxford
Year of birth missing